Barbara Oddone (born 5 April 1970) is a former Italian deaf female tennis player. She has represented Italy at the Deaflympics from 1989 to 2013. Oddone has won a total of 18 medals at the Deaflympics, which enlightens the career best performance by any Italian player at the Deaflympic history.

She is also regarded as one of the greatest tennis players to have competed at the Deaflympics with a record haul of 18 medals including 15 gold medals.

Oddone was awarded the Deaf Sportswoman of the Year in 1997 by the ICSD after winning gold medals in the women's singles, doubles and mixed doubles at the 1997 Summer Deaflympics. She was also nominated for the Deaf Sportswoman of the Year award in 1996, 2001 and in 2009.

References

External links 
 
 Profile at matchstat
 
 2009 Deaflympics video

1970 births
Living people
Italian female tennis players
Deaf tennis players
Deaflympic competitors for Italy
Italian deaf people